The Western Front is an Australian rules football television series that has been broadcast on Network Ten in Western Australia in 2002 and ended on 8 October 2011.

The show has been hosted by Tim Gossage and Lachy Reid from its debut until 2010, but for the 2011 season, Reid will host it with a guest host each week.

The show is notable for encouraging people to form a "big 'W'" hand sign in the background of television broadcasts on any show on any network.  The sign is created by holding your hands up in front of you with the thumbs touching and only the index fingers extended, to form a "W" shape.  Each week the show highlights signs seen at football matches, behind outside broadcasts or posed photos of people forming the W at notable locations around the world. They also encourage celebrities to form the "W" sign, and have filmed Kevin Rudd, John Howard, Jennifer Hawkins and Kobe Bryant.

The show is broadcast on Saturday afternoons, normally between the two midday and night games that Network Ten has the rights to broadcast, and prior to Before the Game, the nationally broadcast football comedy show.  It is one of the few regularly broadcast shows apart from news programs to be filmed in Western Australia.

References

External links

Network 10 original programming
Australian rules football television series
2002 Australian television series debuts
2011 Australian television series endings
Television shows set in Perth, Western Australia